{{safesubst:#invoke:RfD|||month = March
|day = 18
|year = 2023
|time = 15:39
|timestamp = 20230318153925

|content=
REDIRECT Voyage (ABBA album)

}}